John M. Falcone (January 21, 1967 – February 18, 2011) was a police officer in Poughkeepsie, New York, and was the first officer killed in the line of duty in the city of Poughkeepsie.

Biography
John M. Falcone was born on January 21, 1967, in Brooklyn, New York, to John and Margaret Falcone. He has one sister, Victoria Fiorisi. He worked 18 years for the City of Poughkeepsie Police Department and 20 years on the job. Falcone lived in Milton, New York, and grew up in Putnam County, New York, where his parents still live.

Death
Officer John Falcone was shot with his service weapon while he was attempting physically subdue Lee Welch (who was killed with a self-inflicted gunshot during a struggle with Officer Thomas Matthews), who had just shot and killed his wife, Jessica Welch.

Memorials

Roadway Renamed 
On February 21, 2012, the Metropolitan Transportation Authority (MTA) granted permission to the City of Poughkeepsie Police Benevolent Association to rename Railroad Avenue to Detective John Falcone Memorial Avenue. The private roadway is owned and operated by the MTA and is the site where Falcone's death occurred.

Highway Renamed 
On April 29, 2014, a 2-mile section of U.S. Route 9 was approved legislation by The Senate Transportation Committee to be designated the John M. Falcone Memorial Highway. The highway is a major thoroughfare in and out of the City of Poughkeepsie.

On August 1, 2014, the section of highway in Dutchess County, NY was officially named in honor of City of Poughkeepsie Police Officer John Falcone by New York Governor Andrew M. Cuomo. A portion of the roadway on U.S. Route 9 was designated as the "Detective John M. Falcone Memorial Highway" after Falcone, an 18-year police veteran was killed in the line of duty while trying to protect a three-year-old girl in 2011.

Annual Detective John M. Falcone Memorial Ride 
The New York State Supreme Court Officers Association as well as the City of Poughkeepsie Benevolent Association holds an annual memorial motorcycle ride in honor of the slain police officer.

Each year hundreds of riders participate in the event including law enforcement, local riders and motorcycle clubs. The ride was created to honor a courageous man and local hero who made the ultimate sacrifice while in the line of duty while trying to save the life of a three-year-old girl.

References

1967 births
2011 deaths
American police officers killed in the line of duty
Burials at Holy Cross Cemetery, Brooklyn
Deaths by firearm in New York (state)
Male murder victims
People from Marlboro, New York
People murdered in New York (state)